WXXJ (106.5 MHz) is an FM radio station owned by Cox Media Group.  It is licensed to Jacksonville, Florida and serves the Jacksonville metropolitan area with an alternative rock format.  WXXJ broadcasts with 6,000 watts of both horizontal and vertical power. The station's offices and studios are located at 8000 Belfort Parkway on the Southside of Jacksonville, and the transmitter tower is in the Arlington district.

History
According to the Facility_id=28894&Callsign=WEZI FCC's Call Sign History, 106.5 MHz was issued a construction permit WPVJ in July 1994.

The station signed on as call letters WTLK-FM on September 30, 1996, and was known as Real Radio 106.5, with a Hot Talk format.  The most notable event during this part of the station's history was the return of The Greaseman to Jacksonville's airwaves.  (Ironically, the Greaseman's previous time in Jacksonville had been on WAPE when it was on AM 690 (the current home of WOKV)).  The Greaseman Show aired 6-10AM weekdays. Numerous nationally syndicated shows filled the 10AM-noon slot, including hosts Mike Walker, Alan Keyes and Bo Gritz. "The Judy Jarvis Show" aired between noon and 3PM, The Don and Mike Show from 3-7 PM, The Tom Leykis Show from 7-10PM, "Ferrall on the Bench" with Scott Ferrall from 10PM-1AM and Joey Reynolds aired overnights from 1-6. Weekend programming consisted of classic rock music provided by Westwood One's syndicated "Adult Rock & Roll" format.

WTLK flipped to classic rock at 3 p.m. on January 16, 1998, becoming known as Big 106.5, and changing to the WBGB call letters in March 1998.  At this time, the station was owned by Clear Channel Communications. The format change began with a 10,000 commercial-free song launch that ended on February 18, 1998. That morning, former WPLA and WNZS part-time air personality Randy Clemens became the first live local DJ on the station, with program director Steve Fox handling afternoon drive. The remaining dayparts were filled by Westwood One air talent, including Jeff Gonzer, Terry Gladstone, Tony Scott, Frazer Smith and Mackenzie Rae.

WBGB was divested by Clear Channel, along with sister stations WZNZ, WZAZ, and WJGR, in the fall of 1999 to Concord Media Group.  From there, it came under the ownership of Jacor, who in turn sold the station to Caron Broadcasting (a division of Salem Communications) in 2003.

Caron then flipped WBGB to Contemporary Christian, branding the station as 106.5 The Promise.  On July 6, 2006, Salem Communications entered into an agreement to sell WBGB to Cox Media Group for $7.7 million in cash.  The last day the station broadcast as 106.5 The Promise was Monday, September 18, 2006.  The format then moved to non-commercial religious broadcaster 88.1 WCRJ, which adopted The Promise name, as well as a number of on-air staffers.

In the afternoon on Tuesday, September 19, WBGB began stunting, letting listeners know that The Promise had moved to 88.1, and promising something "new and exciting" to come to 106.5 on Thursday, September 21.  The new format of WBGB, a simulcast of talk station WOKV, was revealed on Cox's Investor Relations website on September 20.

On May 1, 2013, the FM simulcast was transferred to 104.5 FM (formerly WFYV-FM). The move expanded its broadcast coverage area from Brunswick, Georgia south to Daytona Beach, Florida, southwest to Gainesville, Florida and west to Lake City, Florida. The simulcast on 106.5 FM continued for a short time as the station told listeners about the change. 106.5 FM officially dropped from the simulcast on May 23 at Midnight, and flipped to Urban AC as "Hot 106.5". The new format launched with a marathon playing of 10,000 songs in a row, which began with "P.Y.T." by Michael Jackson. The station changed its call sign to WHJX on the same day.

On September 24, 2015, WHJX began simulcasting on translator W258CN (99.5 FM) as "Hot 99.5", and began redirecting listeners to the new frequency. On September 29, 2015, at Noon, 106.5 FM flipped to soft adult contemporary as "Easy 106.5", with the call sign already changed to WEZI five days prior. Core artists heard on WEZI include Elton John, Whitney Houston, Gloria Estefan and Billy Joel.

On November 20, 2017, WEZI and sister station WXXJ (102.9 FM) swapped formats, with WEZI becoming alternative rock-formatted "X106.5". No other changes are expected on either station. The stations swapped call signs on November 26, 2017.

References

External links

XXJ (FM)
Cox Media Group
Radio stations established in 1996
1996 establishments in Florida